Galit Atlas (born September 12, 1971) is an internationally known psychoanalyst recognized for her rethinking of the place of sexuality and desire in contemporary theory and practice. Her new and innovative work on emotional inheritance explores the ways our ancestors' experiences shape our lives.

Career
Atlas practices psychoanalysis and is a clinical supervisor in private practice in Manhattan. As an essayist and author, Atlas has published numerous articles and book chapters that focus primarily on gender and sexuality. She is a clinical assistant professor on the faculty of the New York University Postdoctoral Program in Psychotherapy & Psychoanalysis, faculty member of the Institute for Expressive Analysis and faculty of the National Training Programs (NTP) and the Four Year Adult training program

In 2009, she became a recipient of the NADTA Research award, in the category 'Theoretical Research Award for Thesis/Dissertation'. From 2011–2013, she co-chaired and moderated the on-line Colloquium Series for the International Association for Relational Psychoanalysis and Psychotherapy (IARPP). She is on the editorial board of Psychoanalytic Perspectives and served on the board of directors of the Division of Psychoanalysis (39) of the American Psychological Association. Atlas lectures throughout the United States and internationally.

In 2016, Atlas's New York Times publication "A Tale of Two Twins" was the winner of the Gradiva Award, New Media.

Books
Atlas's book Emotional Inheritance: A Therapist, Her Patients and the Legacy of Trauma (Little, Brown Spark, January 2022) sheds light on the extraordinary ways in which inherited family trauma affects our lives. In her writing she entwines the stories of her patients, her own stories, and decades of research to help us identify the links between our life struggles and the "emotional inheritance" we all carry.

Atlas has published three books for clinicians. She is the author of The Enigma of Desire: Sex, Longing and Belonging in Psychoanalysis (Routledge, October 2015). The leading psychoanalyst and feminist Jessica Benjamin declared that the book is "clinically astute and theoretically provocative", and that Atlas "recaptures the realm of sexuality for relational psychoanalysis". Her book has been translated into three languages. 
Her second book Dramatic Dialogue: Contemporary Clinical Practice (Routledge, 2017), is co-authored with Lewis Aron and introduces relational principles for contemporary clinical practice.
In 2020 she published When Minds Meet: The Work of Lewis Aron.

Selected publications 
 Atlas, G. (2022). Emotional inheritance: A therapist, her patients and the legacy of trauma. Little, Brown Spark.
 Atlas, G., & Aron, L. (2017). Dramatic dialogue: Contemporary clinical practice. Routledge.
 Atlas, G. (2017). El enigma del deseo: Sexo, anhelo y pertenencia en psicoanálisis. (M. Saba, Trans.). Karnac. (Original publicado en 2016).
 Atlas. G. (2015). The enigma of desire: sex, longing and belonging in psychoanalysis. Routledge.
 Atlas. G. (2015). Confusion of tongues: Trauma and playfulness. In: "The legacy of Sandor Ferenczi: from ghost to ancestor” S. Kuchuck & A. Harris (Eds.). Routledge. 
 Atlas, G, & Benjamin, J. (2015). The “Too Muchness” of Excitement: Sexuality in Light of Excess, Attachment and Affect Regulation. International Journal for Psychoanalysis. 96(1), 39-63.
 Aron. L., & Atlas. G. (2015) Generative enactment: Memories from the future. Psychoanalytic Dialogues: The International Journal of Relational Perspectives, 25: 309-324.
 Atlas. G. (2014). What’s love got to do with it. In: The bonds of love, revisited. E. Rozmarin (Ed.). Routledge.
 Atlas, G. (2015). Touch me, know me: The enigma of erotic longing. Psychoanalytic Psychology. 32(1), 123-139.
 Atlas, G. (2014). Fireworks. Psychoanalytic Perspective. 10, 390-391.
 Atlas, G. (2014). Sex lies and psychoanalysis- In: When the personal becomes professional: Clinical implications of the psychoanalyst’s life experience. S. Kuchuck (Ed.). Routledge.

References

External links 
 Official Website

American psychoanalysts
Jewish psychoanalysts
1971 births
Living people
New York University faculty
People from Tel Aviv